The Men's 100 metres T46 event at the 2012 Summer Paralympics took place at the London Olympic Stadium on 6 September.

 There being no event for T45 competitors - double arm amputees - two such athletes took part in this event, and one of them, Zhao Xu of China, took the gold medal.

Records
Prior to the competition, the existing World and Paralympic records were as follows.

Results

Round 1
Competed 6 September 2012 from 11:55. Qual. rule: first 2 in each heat (Q) plus the 2 fastest other times (q) qualified.

Heat 1

Heat 2

Heat 3

Final
Competed 6 September 2012 at 20:12.

 
Q = qualified by place. q = qualified by time. WRC = World Record for athlete's classification. PRC = Paralympic Record for athlete's classification. RR = Regional Record. PB = Personal Best. SB = Seasonal Best. DQ = Disqualified. DNS = Did not start.

References

Athletics at the 2012 Summer Paralympics
2012 in men's athletics